Nico Gleirscher (born 17 March 1997) is an Austrian luger.

Career
He started competing for the Austrian national team in the various youth categories, finishing second overall in the Youth World Cup in 2013/14 and third in the Junior World Cup in 2014/15.

He made his World Cup debut in the 2015/16 season, on 29 November 2015, in Igls, finishing the singles event and in 19th position. He got his first podium on 26 November 2017 in Winterberg in the single sprint, where he finished third, and his first win on 3 January 2021 in Schönau am Königssee, where he won the team race together with Madeleine Egle, Thomas Steu and Lorenz Koller. Overall, as his best result, he placed 17th in 2017/18.

He is the son of Gerhard and is the brother of David, who have also been successful elite lugers.

On 29 January 2021, he became the world champion in the sprint classification, ahead of Semen Pavlichenko, and his brother David came third.

References

External links

1997 births
Living people
Austrian male lugers
Sportspeople from Innsbruck
Lugers at the 2022 Winter Olympics
Olympic lugers of Austria
21st-century Austrian people